Rzeczyce  is a village in the administrative district of Gmina Frampol, within Biłgoraj County, Lublin Voivodeship, in eastern Poland.

The village has a population of 325.

References

Villages in Biłgoraj County